The Geminaginaceae are a family of smut fungi in the order Ustilaginomycetes. The family is monotypic, containing the single genus Geminagina, with the species Geminago nonveilleri.

References

Ustilaginomycotina
Basidiomycota families
Monogeneric fungus families